Tonga participated in the 2010 Summer Youth Olympics in Singapore.

The Tongan squad consist of 2 athletes competing in 2 sports: taekwondo and weightlifting.

Taekwondo

Weightlifting

Boys

References

External links
Competitors List: Tonga

Nations at the 2010 Summer Youth Olympics
2010 in Tongan sport
Tonga at the Youth Olympics